Oriano Ripoli (19 December 1923 – 11 October 2019)  was an Italian politician.

He was a member of the Italian Socialist Party and was elected Mayor of Pisa on 10 September 1985. He resigned and left his office on 15 July 1986 for a lack of majority.

He died in Pisa on 11 October 2019.

See also
1985 Italian local elections
List of mayors of Pisa

References

External links
 

1923 births
2019 deaths
Mayors of Pisa
Italian Socialist Party politicians
20th-century Italian politicians